Jonathan Scott Holloway (born 1967) is an American historian and academic administrator who is the 21st president of Rutgers, The State University of New Jersey.

Holloway was named as the president of Rutgers University in January 2020 and assumed the position on July 1, 2020. Before coming to Rutgers, he was the provost of Northwestern University, a position he held between August 1, 2017 and July 1, 2020. Before that, he was the dean of Yale College and Edmund S. Morgan Professor of African American Studies, History, and American Studies at Yale University.

Early life and education
Holloway was born in Hawaii and raised on military bases in Montgomery, Alabama, and Maryland, while his father served in the United States Air Force. He was a star football player at Winston Churchill High School in Potomac, Maryland, and he was named an All-American honorable mention by USA Today.

Holloway was recruited to play linebacker at Stanford University but graduated in 1989 without starting a game. While on Stanford's football team, he was a teammate of future U.S. Senator Cory Booker. He earned a Bachelor of Arts in American studies. Holloway earned a Ph.D. in history from Yale University in 1995.

Academic career
He began his academic career at the University of California, San Diego, before returning to Yale and joining its faculty in 1999. He became a full professor there in 2004.

Holloway was appointed Master (now known as "Head") of Calhoun College in 2005 and chaired the governing body of Yale's residential colleges, the Council of Masters, from 2009 to 2014. As a Master, Holloway was respected for his approachability, charisma, and involvement in student life. For several years, he opposed the change of name of Calhoun, despite student demands, and noted the irony of his serving as the Master of that college; but he changed his mind as many students became more vocal in their opposition to the name in 2015. He was considered a candidate for dean of Yale College in 2008, though Mary Miller was eventually appointed. He was appointed as her successor in May 2014 by Yale President Peter Salovey, making him Yale's first black dean.

During the protests regarding Halloween costumes at Yale in November 2015, while he was dean, Holloway strongly supported the costume guidelines issued by his office (guidelines which some critics saw as unnecessary), calling them "exactly right." Holloway is a supporter of affirmative action programs and reparations (albeit not cash transfers).

Holloway left Yale and became provost of Northwestern University on August 1, 2017.

Holloway is the author of Confronting the Veil: Abram Harris Jr., E. Franklin Frazier, and Ralph Bunche, 1919-1941 (2002) and Jim Crow Wisdom: Memory and Identity in Black America Since 1940 (2013), both published by the University of North Carolina Press. He edited Ralph Bunche’s A Brief and Tentative Analysis of Negro Leadership (NYU Press, 2005) and co-edited Black Scholars on the Line: Race, Social Science, and American Thought in the 20th Century (University of Notre Dame Press, 2007). He wrote an introduction for a new edition of W.E.B. Du Bois’s Souls of Black Folk, published by Yale University Press in 2015.

Rutgers University

On January 21, 2020, Rutgers University announced that Holloway has been selected as the university's twenty-first president. He assumed the position on July 1, 2020, following the resignation of the university's previous president Dr. Robert L. Barchi. Holloway is Rutgers' first Black president.

Personal life
Holloway is married to Aisling Colón, and they have two children. His older brother Brian Holloway played professional football in the NFL.

Publications

Books

Edited volumes

Critical editions

References

African-American historians
Stanford University School of Humanities and Sciences alumni
Yale Graduate School of Arts and Sciences alumni
Yale University faculty
Intellectual historians
African-American academic administrators
1967 births
Living people
21st-century American historians
21st-century American male writers
American male non-fiction writers
21st-century African-American writers
20th-century African-American people
Rutgers University–Newark faculty
African-American male writers